Petrovka is a village in Chüy Region of Kyrgyzstan. It is part of the Moskva District. Its population was 10,879 in 2021.

Population

References

Populated places in Chüy Region